Leylan-e Shomali Rural District is in Leylan District of Malekan County, East Azerbaijan province, Iran. At the National Census of 2006, its population was 3,838 in 858 households. There were 4,338 inhabitants in 1,117 households at the following census of 2011. At the most recent census of 2016, the population of the rural district was 4,172 in 1,236 households. The largest of its 11 villages was Qush Qayeh, with 940 people.

References 

Malekan County

Rural Districts of East Azerbaijan Province

Populated places in East Azerbaijan Province

Populated places in Malekan County